Great Cranberry Island is an island located in Maine. It is the largest of the five islands of the Town of Cranberry Isles, Maine.

Great Cranberry Island is a favorite vacation spot for many.  Access to the island is provided by ferry from either Northeast Harbor or Southwest Harbor, both located on Mount Desert Island.  Many islanders also have their own boats and dock at Spurling Cove.

The population of the island is over 300 in the summertime, but the year-round population is only around 40. The year-round population is mostly fishermen who fish the shores for the ever-popular seafood, lobster.

Notable locations on the island are the History Museum, which includes a public trail to the shore, the General Store, the school and library, Post Office, Whale's Rib Gift Shop and Crow Island, which is accessible only at low tide.

The Ladies' Aid Fair, held each year since 1900 in August, is a highlight of the annual calendar.

The island was home to award-winning artist Wini Smart, who painted hundreds of oil and watercolor paintings around Great Cranberry Island and the surrounding Mount Desert Island area.

It is the setting of the fictional children's book My Kindergarten by Rosemary Wells.

The island is also featured in a Fallout 4 expansion pack, Far Harbor.
 
Great Cranberry Island was also home to the GCI 50K Ultra Marathon and The Great Run put on by Crow Athletics and long-distance runner Gary Allen.

External links
 Photograph of Main Street, Cranberry Island, ca. 1910, from the Maine Memory Network
 Great Cranberry Island Official Website
 Great Cranberry Island Tour Map (PDF)

Islands of Hancock County, Maine
Islands of Maine
Coastal islands of Maine